The Living Planet Index (LPI) is an indicator of the state of global biological diversity, based on trends in vertebrate populations of species from around the world. The Zoological Society of London (ZSL) manages the index in cooperation with the World Wide Fund for Nature (WWF).

As of 2022, the index is statistically created from journal studies, online databases and government reports for 31,821 populations of 5,230 species of mammal, bird, reptile, amphibian and fish.

Results
According to the 2022 report, monitored wildlife populations declined by 69% on average between 1970 and 2018,  suggesting that natural ecosystems are degrading at a rate unprecedented in human history  The extent of declines varies with geographic region, with monitored vertebrate populations in Latin America and the Caribbean experiencing average declines of 94%.   One of the key drivers of declines has been identified as land-use change and the associated habitat loss and degradation, often linked to unsustainable agriculture, logging, or other development.

Calculation
The Living Planet Database (LPD) has been available online since 2013, and has been maintained by ZSL since 2016. The LPD contains more than 30,000 population trends for more than 5,200 species of fish, amphibians, reptiles, birds and mammals.

The global LPI is calculated using these population time-series, which are gathered from a variety of sources such as journals, online databases and government reports.

A generalized additive modelling framework is used to determine the underlying trend in each population time-series. Average rates of change are calculated and aggregated to the species level.

Each species trend is aggregated to produce an index for the terrestrial, marine and freshwater systems. This process uses a weighted average method which places most weight on the largest (most species-rich) groups within a biogeographic realm. This is done to counteract the uneven spatial and taxonomic distribution of data in the LPD. The three system indices are then averaged to produce the global LPI.

Criticism
The fact that "all decreases in population size, regardless of whether they bring a population close to extinction, are equally accounted for" has been noted as a limitation.

In 2005, WWF authors identified that the population data was potentially unrepresentative. As of 2009, the database was found to contain too much bird data and gaps in the population coverage of tropical species, although it showed "little evidence of bias toward threatened species". The 2016 report was criticized by a professor at Duke University for over-representing western Europe, where more data were available. Talking to National Geographic, he criticised the attempt to combine data from different regions and ecosystems into a single figure, arguing that such reports are likely motivated by a desire to grab attention and raise money.

A 2017 investigation of the index by members of the ZSL team published in PLOS One  found higher declines than had been estimated, and indications that in areas where less data is available, species might be declining more quickly.

In 2020, a re-analysis of the baseline data by McGill University showed that the overall estimated trend of a decline by 60% since 1970 was driven by less than 3% of the studied populations; when some outliers of extreme decline are removed, the decline still exists but is considerably less catastrophic, and when more outliers (roughly amounting to 2.4% of the populations) are removed, the trend shifts to that of a decline between the 1980s and 2000s, but a roughly positive trend after 2000. This extreme sensitivity to outliers indicates that the present approach of the Living Planet Index may be flawed.

Publication
The index was originally developed in 1997 by the World Wide Fund for Nature (WWF) in collaboration with the World Conservation Monitoring Centre (UNEP-WCMC), the biodiversity assessment and policy implementation arm of the United Nations Environment Programme. WWF first published the index in 1998. Since 2006, the Zoological Society of London (ZSL) manages the index in cooperation with WWF.

Results are presented biennially in the WWF Living Planet Report and in publications such as the Millennium Ecosystem Assessment and the UN Global Biodiversity Outlook. National and regional reports are now being produced to focus on relevant issues at a smaller scale. The latest edition of the Living Planet Report was released in October 2022.

Coverage
The index is often misinterpreted in the media, with incorrect suggestions that it shows we have lost 69% of all animals or species since 1970. This widespread misinterpretation has led to several articles being published which detail what the LPI does and doesn't show, and how to correctly interpret the trend.

Convention on Biological Diversity 
In April 2002, and again in 2006, at the Convention on Biological Diversity (CBD), 188 nations committed themselves to actions to: "… achieve, by 2010, a significant reduction of the current rate of biodiversity loss at the global, regional and national levels…"

The LPI played a pivotal role in measuring progress towards the CBD's 2010 target. It has also been adopted by the CBD as an indicator of progress towards its Nagoya Protocol 2011-2020 targets 5, 6, and 12 (part of the Aichi Biodiversity Targets).

Informing the CBD 2020 strategic plan, the Indicators and Assessments Unit at ZSL is concerned with ensuring the most rigorous and robust methods are implemented for the measurement of population trends, expanding the coverage of the LPI to more broadly represent biodiversity, and disaggregating the index in meaningful ways (such as assessing the changes in exploited or invasive species).

See also
 Millennium Development Goals
 Sustainable development
 Sustainable Development Goals

Further reading
 WWF (2022) "Living Planet Report 2022 – Building a nature-positive society". Almond, R.E.A., Grooten, M., Juffe Bignoli, D. & Petersen, T. (Eds). WWF, Gland, Switzerland.
 Westveer, J, Freeman, R., McRae, L., Marconi, V., Almond, R.E.A, and Grooten, M. (2022)  "A Deep Dive into the Living Planet Index: A Technical Report". WWF, Gland, Switzerland.

References

External links 

 LPI at GitHub

Biodiversity
Environmental indices
Ecological metrics